The Park Drive 2000 was a series of invitational snooker tournaments staged between 1971 and 1972. All four editions were sponsored by Park Drive cigarettes. The four invited players played each other in a round-robin, with the top two then contesting a final. The winner of the final received prize money of £750 and the runner up received £550.

John Spencer won three of the tournaments, with Ray Reardon winning the other. Each final was recorded and shown on BBC Grandstand. The highest  in any of the matches was a 146 compiled by Reardon in the Spring 1972 event.

Winners

1971 (January)
The event was played between four invited professionals, as a triple round-robin. Matches were played across 18 club venues, with the final placing below. As the top two players in the round-robin, Spencer and Williams played each other in the final, which was televised by the BBC. Spencer won the final 4–1.

1971 (October)
The event was played between four invited professionals, as a triple round-robin. Ray Reardon, who had not been able to participate in the January event as he had been on a tour of South Africa, was included. As the top two players in the round-robin, Spencer and Reardon played each other in the final, with Reardon winning 4–3.

1972 (Spring)
The event was played between four invited professionals, as a triple round-robin. Reardon made a break of 146 in the round-robin stage, which was the highest-ever break in competitive play until overtaken by Spencer's maximum break at the 1979 Holsten Lager International. Alex Higgins, playing in his first major professional tournament, came second in the round robin rankings and lost 3–4 to Spencer. The following day, the same two players played the start of the week-long final of the 1972 World Snooker Championship.

1972 (Autumn)
The event was played between four invited professionals, as a triple round-robin. Spencer finished behind Higgins in the round-robin standings, but beat him 5–3 in the final. The final was held at Belle Vue, Manchester, in front of 2,000 spectators.

References

Snooker non-ranking competitions
Recurring sporting events established in 1971
Recurring events disestablished in 1972
Defunct snooker competitions